Veliki Brat VIP 4 was the fourth season of the regional celebrity version of Veliki Brat. The airing starts on 30 January 2010. It was aired on four television channels in four countries: Pink in Serbia, Pink BH in Bosnia-Herzegovina, and Pink M in Montenegro and Sitel in Macedonia.

Celebrities from Serbia, Bosnia and Herzegovina, Croatia, Montenegro and Macedonia competed for €50,000. The host of the show is Marijana Mićić.

This season the house is split into two parts (rich and poor) and housemates are split into two teams.

The winner was Serbian actor Milan Marić, while the runner-up was singer Anabela Đogani.

Housemates
All housemates entered the show on Day 1.

Nominations table

 Housemates are split into two teams. Each week housemates have to each nominate two members (of their own team) and the one from each team with the most nominations faces the public vote to save. As Anabela and Boki 13 had the same votes, Alden, as the team leader, chose Boki 13 to be up for eviction.
 This round of nomination was made by the public. The public voted for their favourite housemate and the three housemates with the fewest votes are nominated.
 Ervin and Tamara were tied with five votes each and the housemate with the fewest public votes would be evicted.

External links 
 Production website (English)

2010 Serbian television seasons
04
2010 Bosnia and Herzegovina television seasons
2010 Montenegrin television seasons
2010 Serbian television series debuts